The Tales series, known in Japan as the Tales of series, is a franchise of fantasy Japanese role-playing video games published by Bandai Namco Entertainment (formerly Namco), and developed by its subsidiary, Namco Tales Studio until 2011 and presently by Bandai Namco. First begun in 1995 with the development and release of Tales of Phantasia for the Super Famicom, the series currently spans sixteen main titles, multiple spin-off games and supplementary media in the form of manga series, anime series, and audio dramas.

Multiple titles in the series use licensed theme songs by multiple Japanese artists: among the artists are Garnat Crow (Eternia), Deen (Destiny/Hearts), Kokia (Innocence) and Ayumi Hamasaki (Xillia/Xillia 2). One recurring aspect of many earlier localizations was the removal of the Japanese theme song, such as with Symphonia, which had its theme song replaced with an orchestral version. The first western release of a Tales title to feature the theme song used in Japan was Vesperia.

Lists

Original Soundtracks

Related single albums

Notes 

 Japanese

 General notes

References